In probability theory, the central limit theorem states that, under certain circumstances, the probability distribution of the scaled mean of a random sample converges to a normal distribution as the sample size increases to infinity. Under stronger assumptions, the Berry–Esseen theorem, or Berry–Esseen inequality, gives a more quantitative result, because it also specifies the rate at which this convergence takes place by giving a bound on the maximal error of approximation between the normal distribution and the true distribution of the scaled sample mean. The approximation is measured by the Kolmogorov–Smirnov distance.

Statement of the theorem
Statements of the theorem vary, as it was independently discovered by two mathematicians, Andrew C. Berry (in 1941) and Carl-Gustav Esseen (1942), who then, along with other authors, refined it repeatedly over subsequent decades.

Identically distributed summands

One version, sacrificing generality somewhat for the sake of clarity, is the following:

There exists a positive constant C such that if X1, X2, ..., are i.i.d. random variables with E(X1) = 0, E(X12) = σ2 > 0, and E(|X1|3) = ρ < ∞, and if we define

the sample mean, with Fn the cumulative distribution function of

and Φ the cumulative distribution function of the standard normal distribution, then for all x and n,

That is: given a sequence of independent and identically distributed random variables, each having mean zero and positive variance, if additionally the third absolute moment is finite, then the cumulative distribution functions of the standardized sample mean and the standard normal distribution differ (vertically, on a graph) by no more than the specified amount.  Note that the approximation error for all n (and hence the limiting rate of convergence for indefinite n sufficiently large) is bounded by  the order of n−1/2.

The best estimate , C < 0.4748, follows from the inequality

However, if ρ ≥ 1.286σ3, then the estimate 

 proved that the constant also satisfies the lower bound

Non-identically distributed summands

Let X1, X2, ..., be independent random variables with E(Xi) = 0, E(Xi2) = σi2 > 0, and E(|Xi|3) = ρi < ∞. Also, let

be the normalized n-th partial sum. Denote Fn the cdf of Sn, and Φ the cdf of the standard normal distribution. For the sake of convenience denote  

In 1941, Andrew C. Berry proved that for all n there exists an absolute constant C1 such that

where

Independently, in 1942, Carl-Gustav Esseen proved that for all n there exists an absolute constant C0 such that

where

It is easy to make sure that ψ0≤ψ1. Due to this circumstance inequality (3) is conventionally called the Berry–Esseen inequality, and the quantity ψ0 is called the Lyapunov fraction of the third order. Moreover, in the case where the summands X1, ..., Xn have identical distributions 

and thus the bounds stated by inequalities (1), (2) and (3) coincide apart from the constant.

Regarding C0, obviously, the lower bound established by  remains valid:
 

Multidimensional version
As with the multidimensional central limit theorem, there is a multidimensional version of the Berry–Esseen theorem.

Let  be independent -valued random vectors each having mean zero. Write  and assume  is invertible. Then for all convex sets ,
,

See also
Chernoff's inequality
Edgeworth series
List of inequalities
List of mathematical theorems
Concentration inequality

Notes

References

 
 Durrett, Richard (1991). Probability: Theory and Examples. Pacific Grove, CA: Wadsworth & Brooks/Cole. .
 
 
 Feller, William (1972). An Introduction to Probability Theory and Its Applications, Volume II (2nd ed.). New York: John Wiley & Sons. .
 
 
 Manoukian, Edward B. (1986). Modern Concepts and Theorems of Mathematical Statistics. New York: Springer-Verlag. .
 Serfling, Robert J. (1980). Approximation Theorems of Mathematical Statistics. New York: John Wiley & Sons. .

External links
 Gut, Allan & Holst Lars. Carl-Gustav Esseen, retrieved Mar. 15, 2004.
 

Probabilistic inequalities
Theorems in statistics
Central limit theorem